A rai is a unit of area equal to 1,600 square metres (16 ares, 0.16 hectares, 0.3954 acres), and is used in measuring land area for a cadastre or cadastral map. Its current size is precisely derived from the metre, but is neither part of nor recognized by the modern metric system, the International System (SI).

It can be divided in four ngaan or 400 square wa.

It is commonly used in Thailand. Although recognized by the SI, its use is not encouraged. The word rai also means plantation.

See also

 Thai units of measurement
 Orders of magnitude (area)

References

External links 
 Area metric conversion, British and U.S., Japanese, Chinese, Thai, old French, others.

Units of area
Thai units of measurement